Furious George is an elite men's ultimate club team based in Vancouver, British Columbia, Canada.

Founded in 1995, they were the open champions at the 2002, 2003 and 2005 UPA (now USA Ultimate) Club Championships. They have also won eleven Canadian Ultimate Championships: in 1995, 1996, 1997, 1999, 2000, 2003, 2007, 2011, 2012, 2013 and 2019. Furious George won gold as Team Canada (with several non-regular additions from other club teams around the country) in 1998, 2004 and 2008 at the WFDF World Ultimate Championships. In 2011, Furious George was inducted into the Canadian Ultimate Hall of Fame.

Current Roster 
(As of 2021).

References

External links 
Ultimate Canada

Ultimate (sport) teams
Fur
Ultimate teams established in 1995
1995 establishments in British Columbia